South Africa has been participating at the Deaflympics from 1993 and have bagged 62 medals at the Summer Deaflympics South Africa has never participated in  Winter Deaflympics.

Medal tallies

Summer Deaflympics

Notable athletes 
 Swimmer Terence Parkin's tally of 33 medals is the most at Deaflympics for any individual athlete. He also broke seven Deaflympics records during his career.

See also
South Africa at the Paralympics

South Africa at the Olympics

References